In graph theory and social network analysis, alpha centrality is an alternative name for Katz centrality. It is a measure of centrality of nodes within a graph. It is an adaptation of eigenvector centrality with the addition that nodes are imbued with importance from external sources.

Definition
Given a graph with adjacency matrix , Katz centrality is defined as follows:

The original definition by Katz

used a constant vector . Hubbell
introduced the usage of a general .

Half a century later, Bonacich and Lloyd defined alpha centrality as 

which is essentially identical to Katz centrality.

Motivation

To understand alpha centrality one must first understand eigenvector centrality. An intuitive process to compute eigenvector centrality is to give every node a starting random positive amount of influence. Each node then splits its influence evenly and divides it amongst its outward neighbors, receiving from its inward neighbors in kind. This process repeats until everyone is giving out as much as they're taking in and the system has reached steady state. The amount of influence they have at this steady state is their eigenvector centrality. Computationally this process is called the power method. We know that this process has converged when the vector of influence changes only by a constant as follows:

where  is the amount of influence that node  carries,  is the adjacency matrix and  happens to be the principal eigenvalue.

Alpha centrality enhances this process by allowing nodes to have external sources of influence. The process described above should now stop when

where  is a constant that trades off the importance of external influence against the importance of connection. When  only the external influence matters. When  is very large then only the connectivity matters, i.e. we reduce to the eigenvector centrality case.

Applications
Alpha centrality is implemented in igraph library for network analysis and visualization.

Notes and references

Algebraic graph theory
Social network analysis

es:Centralidad